The Daulet National Tennis Centre ("Dáýlet" Ulttyq Tennıs Ortalyǵy) is a sports venue that is part of the National Tennis Centre at Central Park in Nur-Sultan, Kazakhstan.

References

External links
  
 Venue on the KTF.kz

Sports venues in Astana
Indoor arenas in Kazakhstan
Sports venues completed in 2009